

Public School Board English 

Ottawa-Carleton District School Board
 List of schools of the Ottawa-Carleton District School Board

English Catholic School Board

Ottawa Catholic School Board
 List of schools of the Ottawa Catholic School Board

Public School Board French 

Conseil des écoles publiques de l'Est de l'Ontario
 List of schools of the Conseil des écoles publiques de l'Est de l'Ontario

French Catholic School Board

Conseil des écoles catholiques de langue française du Centre-Est
 List of schools of the Conseil des écoles catholiques de langue française du Centre-Est

References

Further reading

Lists of schools in Ottawa